De Juffer (English: The Damselfly) is a tower mill in Gasselternijveen, in Drenthe province of the Netherlands. It was built in 1971. The mill is listed as a Rijksmonument, number 46615

History

In 1841, a tower mill was built on this site by millwright R Vlieghuis of Borger. The mill was later fitted with Patent sails, the leading edges of which were streamlined using the Van Bussel system. The mill was demolished in 1963. The brake wheel was used in the restoration of De Bonte Hen, Zaandam.

In 1968, it was decided to rebuild the mill. The tower was built by G J Warmink of Gasselternijveen, incorporating material from the mill demolished in 1963. Millwrighting work was by Medendorp of Zuidlaren. The brake wheel and wallower came from a demolished drainage mill De Breeken, which had stood in Westerwijtwerd, Groningen. New sails were fitted in 2009.

Description

De Juffer is what the Dutch describe as a "ronde stenen stellingmolen". It is a five-storey brick tower mill with a stage. This was made by Fabrikaat De Muinck Keizer, of Martenshoek, Groningen in 1899. The windshaft also carries the brake wheel which has 57 cogs. The brake wheel drives the wallower (32 cogs) at the top of the upright shaft. At the bottom of the upright shaft, the great spur wheel (72 cogs) drives the lantern pinion stone nut, which has 19 staves. This drives the  diameter French Burr millstones.

Public access

De Juffer is open to the public on Wednesdays from 13:00 to 15:00, on Saturdays from 10:00 to 12:00 and at other times by appointment.

References

Windmills in Drenthe
Tower mills in the Netherlands
Windmills completed in 1971
Grinding mills in the Netherlands
Rijksmonuments in Drenthe
De Juffer, Gasselternijveen